Love Sux is the seventh studio album by Canadian singer-songwriter Avril Lavigne, released on February 25, 2022, by DTA and Elektra Records. Her first studio album in three years since Head Above Water (2019), Lavigne worked on Love Sux with various artists including Machine Gun Kelly, Blackbear and Mark Hoppus of Blink-182. Musically, it embraces emo pop angst and Lavigne's early skate punk influences from Blink-182, Green Day, NOFX and the Offspring. The album was preceded by two singles: "Bite Me", and "Love It When You Hate Me".

The album received generally positive reviews from music critics, becoming Lavigne's highest-rated album to date. It debuted at number nine on US Billboard 200 with 30,000 equivalent-album units, of which 19,000 were pure album sales. It also entered the top 10 in Australia, Germany, Canada, Japan, and the United Kingdom, among many others. Lavigne promoted Love Sux through a series of public appearances and televised performances. The album was nominated for Album of the Year at the Juno Awards 2023.

A deluxe edition of the album was released on November 25, 2022, following the release of the single "I'm a Mess", a collaboration with British singer Yungblud.

Background and development
Following the release of her previous studio album Head Above Water (2019), Lavigne mentioned in a May 2020 interview with American Songwriter magazine that she would like to release some music in 2021 and that she had started working on new material.

Lavigne was without a record label or management team when she began working on new music, and began writing with American musician Travis Barker. "F.U." was the first song written by the pair in November 2020. The same month, American musician Mod Sun, on whose single "Flames" Lavigne featured in January 2021, introduced Lavigne to producer John Feldmann, who stated "my experience with Avril was unbelievable" adding that "her voice is incredible — her pitch, her tone."

In December 2020, Lavigne confirmed she was recording new music with Feldmann, Barker, Mod Sun and Machine Gun Kelly. With recording for the album being reportedly completed by February 2021.

On November 3, 2021, Lavigne announced she had signed with Barker's label, DTA Records. On January 13, 2022, Lavigne revealed the title of her seventh studio album, along with the release date of February 25, 2022.

Four of the tracks of Love Sux are vocal collaborations with other artists, namely Machine Gun Kelly, Blackbear, Mark Hoppus and Yungblud; the largest amount of collaborations Lavigne had ever included on an album. On working with Hoppus, Lavigne said "...he blew me away... He was writing in front of me, recording his vocals, playing his bass. He can engineer and he's obviously an awesome songwriter and I got to see that firsthand. I have so much respect for him that I just keep gushing about him."

Composition and themes

Music and lyrics
Love Sux was described by Lavigne in an interview with Entertainment Weekly as the "most alternative record I've made from front to back", further explaining "most of my albums have like pop songs, ballads, and it's quite diverse. The people I worked with really understood me and come from that genre of music". She described the recording of the album as feeling as though she was "back in high school hanging out with the type of people [she] grew up with, and it was just effortless." In an interview with Nylon, Lavigne said that "the album is light and happy, even though there's songs about heartbreak and breaking up" but that "it's also anthemic, and it's powerful, and it has a positive message for people to stand up for yourself, to have self-worth." She further stated that Love Sux is the album she had "wanted to make for [her] whole career," drawing skate punk influences from NOFX, Blink-182, Green Day and the Offspring.

The album has been described by critics as being pop-punk, skate punk, alternative rock, and emo pop.

Songs
Love Sux opens with the track "Cannonball", described by Ali Shutler of NME as "a furious electro dance opener" which "starts with a burst of buoyant guitars and the angsty scream of "like a ticking time bomb, I'm about to explode" and that "less than 20 seconds in, the tune veers drastically into hyper-pop territory". The second track "Bois Lie" features American musician Machine Gun Kelly, and was described by Bobby Olivier of Spin as a "speedy duet" which "builds to a he-said-she-said climax", and as "a sonic sequel to MGK's "Forget Me Too"".

"Bite Me" is the album's third track and lead single, and has drawn comparisons to Lavigne's earlier studio albums Let Go (2002) and The Best Damn Thing (2007), as well as to the band Paramore. Billboard described it as a "guitar- and drum-heavy track" which "features Lavigne raging at her former lover for failing to treat her properly, promising that they'll always regret being kicked out of her life." Fourth track and second single "Love It When You Hate Me" was described by Shutner as a "pop-punk banger", and Emily Carter writing for Kerrang! noted that the song "hears the Canadian star embracing nostalgic pop-punk in the chorus – 'The highs the lows the yes, the nos / You're so hot when you get cold / Don't call me baby / I love it when you hate me' – and fresher elements in the verses." The title track "Love Sux" follows as the album's fifth track, and was described by Tom Williams of The Line of Best Fit as featuring "a fantastic guitar-riff that recalls Celebrity Skin-era Hole".

"Kiss Me like the World Is Ending" is the sixth track, which was said by Jessie Atkinson of Gigwise to contain a guitar riff reminiscent of Blink-182's "All the Small Things". Seventh track "Avalanche" was described by Shutler as "find[ing] Lavigne, now 37, just as confused as she was on her 2002 breakout track "Complicated", featuring the lyrics "I wish my life came with instructions" but that "with a delicious, synth-driven breakdown, she's far more self-assured here." 10th track "All I Wanted", featuring Mark Hoppus, "sees the two punk veterans trade in various past memories for a surprisingly affecting number". 11th track "Dare to Love Me" is a "delicate ballad" containing "fraught emotion", and was described by Atkinson as a "piano led beauty". "Break of a Heartache" is the album's 12th and final track, and was said by Shannon Garner of Clash to be a "bombastic number that confidently brushes off past trauma and reassures people that you can overcome things and change how you feel towards certain situations given the time."

Promotion

Lavigne made a concert at The Roxy Theater in New York City, celebrating on Love Sux album release party with Machine Gun Kelly and Travis Barker she performed the songs from the album "Bite Me", "Love It When You Hate Me",  and "Bois Lie" with Machine Gun Kelly and her other hit songs.

Singles
The album's lead single, "Bite Me", was released on November 10, 2021. The second single, "Love It When You Hate Me", featuring Blackbear, was released on January 14, 2022. An acoustic version of "Bois Lie", featuring Machine Gun Kelly, was released as a promotional single on August 26, 2022. A live video for this song was released on YouTube the same day, featuring footage from Machine Gun Kelly's Mainstream Sellout Tour, on which Lavigne was part of as a supporting act.

Tour
To promote the album, Lavigne embarked on the Love Sux Tour, originally titled the Bite Me Tour, in 2022. The European leg was originally scheduled for that year until it got pushed to 2023 due to the ongoing COVID-19 pandemic. In addition, the pandemic also delayed some dates in the Canadian leg due to positive cases within the tour and subsequent exposures.

Critical reception 

Love Sux received generally positive reviews from music critics. At Metacritic, which assigns a normalized rating out of 100 to reviews from mainstream critics, the album has an average score of 74 based on 11 reviews. It marks Lavigne's highest-rated album of her career to date.

In a positive review from Clash, Shannon Garner wrote that "it would be easy to disregard Lavigne's album as part of the current 2000s nostalgia storm that's on the rise but it's far from hazy nostalgia", further remarking that Love Sux "showcases growth in Lavigne as an artist", and that the album is "more of an antidote to pop progress rather than a nostalgic throwback", concluding that "it just has all the elements of what made us fall in love with Avril Lavigne in the first place."

Tom Williams of The Line of Best Fit complimented Love Sux, commenting that the album "brings the energy up to a 10 almost immediately and rarely turns it down across the album's 33 minutes."

Roisin O'Connor of The Independent wrote that the album is "Lavigne's best album since 2007's The Best Damn Thing, which moved away from her earlier grunge-based sound and into catchier territory. It says a lot about the 37-year-old's conviction that her rebel-girl schtick doesn't feel hackneyed." While critical of some of the album's lyrics, O'Connor concluded that Love Sux is "shameless but cathartic hit of nostalgia".

Writing for NME, Ali Shutler reviewed Love Sux positively, remarking that the album "is an unapologetic blast of self-empowerment" and "a progressive pop-punk album that eschews the old rules – but not at the expense of maximalist, joyful guitar anthems."

Hannah Jane Parkinson of The Guardian opined that the album contains "high-energy bangers one after the other", and is "exuberant enough to have you partying like it's 2002."

In a more mixed review, Jessie Atkinson of Gigwise commented "Now thirty-seven years old, Avril is still playing with schoolbook colloquialisms and the dramas of one who is unlucky in love. The results are undeniably fun, especially for those of us who were young at the time of 2002's Let Go – and the new youth, who are dabbling in chequered wrist warmers and smudged liner. Sadly, Love Sux sounds too much like a 2002 carbon copy to truly impress in 2022."

Accolades

Commercial performance
In Canada, Love Sux debuted at number three on the Billboard Canadian Albums chart, it was Lavigne's seventh album to enter the top 10 on the chart. In Australia the album debuted at number three on the ARIA Albums Chart, becoming Lavigne's seventh top 10 album in the country and her highest charting album since Goodbye Lullaby in 2011. In Germany, Love Sux debuted at number six on Offizielle Deutsch Chart, becoming her sixth top 10 album in the country. In the United Kingdom, the album debuted at number three on the UK Albums chart with 13,622 units sold on its first week, making it her highest position on the chart since her 2007 album The Best Damn Thing. Love Sux is also the best-selling female cassette of 2022 (third overall).

In the United States, Love Sux debuted at number nine on the Billboard 200 chart with 30,000 album-equivalent units on its first week, which consisted 19,000 pure copies, and 10,000 streaming units. It became Lavigne's sixth top ten effort overall and her first since her 2013 self-titled record. The album went straight to number two on the Billboard Top Album Sales chart, it was the second best selling album on that week, debuting at number two on the Top Rock Albums chart and Top Alternative Albums chart, it was Lavigne's first album to enter the Top Rock Albums chart and her highest position on the Top Alternative Albums chart since 2007.

In Japan, Love Sux debuted at number seven on the Oricon Japanese Albums chart with 11,573 units sold on its first week (9,882 physical copies and 1,252 digital copies), making it Lavigne's seventh studio album to enter the top ten in Japan. On the Billboard Japanese Hot Albums chart the album debuted at number six. Uniquely in Japan, the album was released by Sony Music instead of DTA and Elektra Records. Love Sux is the 67th most downloaded album in Japan in 2022. In November, by the vinyl edition release of Love Sux it debuted at number 24 on the UK Vinyl Albums Chart.

Track listing

Personnel
Credits adapted from the liner notes of Love Sux.

Musicians
 Avril Lavigne – vocals, guitar (12)
 John Feldmann – bass, guitar
 Dylan McLean – additional bass, additional guitar
 Michael Bono – additional bass, additional guitar
 Scot Stewart – additional bass, additional guitar
 Travis Barker – drums (1–6, 9–10)
 Machine Gun Kelly – vocals (2)
 Blackbear – vocals (4)
 Mod Sun – drums (7–8, 11–12)
 Mark Hoppus – vocals (10)

Production
 John Feldmann – production (1–8, 10–12)
 Mod Sun – production (1–8, 10–12)
 Travis Barker – production (1–6, 9–10)
 Cameron Mizell – additional production (1–8, 10–12)
 Dylan McLean – additional production (1–8, 10–12)
 Hero DeLano – additional production (1–8, 10–12)
 Josh Thornberry – additional production (1–8, 10–12)
 Michael Bono – additional production (1–8, 10–12)
 Scot Stewart – additional production (1–8, 10–12)

Technical
 Chris Gehringer – mastering
 Adam Hawkins – mixing (1–3, 5–6, 8, 10, 12)
 Manny Marroquin – mixing (4)
 Neal Avron – mixing (7, 11)
 Cameron Mizell – additional engineer  (1–8, 10–12)
 Dylan McLean – engineer (1–8, 10–12)
 Hero DeLano – additional engineer (1–8, 10–12)
 Josh Thornberry – additional engineer (1–8, 10–12)
 Michael Bono – additional engineer (1–8, 10–12)
 Scot Stewart - engineer (1–8, 10–12)
 Kevin Thrash –  engineer (9), additional engineer (2–6, 10)
 Andrew Goldstein – additional engineer (4)

Design
 Alex Kirzhner – art direction
 Sam Jennings – artwork, package design
 Joe Termini – photography

Charts

Weekly charts

Year-end charts

Release history

References

2022 albums
Avril Lavigne albums
Albums produced by John Feldmann
Albums produced by Travis Barker
DTA Records albums
Elektra Records albums